{{DISPLAYTITLE:Cytochrome b5}}

Cytochromes b5 are ubiquitous electron transport hemoproteins found in animals, plants, fungi and purple phototrophic bacteria. The microsomal and mitochondrial variants are membrane-bound, while bacterial and those from erythrocytes and other animal tissues are water-soluble. The family of cytochrome b5-like proteins includes (besides cytochrome b5 itself) hemoprotein domains covalently associated with other redox domains in flavocytochrome cytochrome b2 (L-lactate dehydrogenase), sulfite oxidase, plant and fungal nitrate reductases, and plant and fungal cytochrome b5/acyl lipid desaturase fusion proteins.

Structure 

3-D structures of a number of cytochrome b5 and yeast flavocytochrome b2 are known. The fold belongs to the α+β class, with two hydrophobic cores on each side of a β-sheet. The larger hydrophobic core constitutes the heme-binding pocket, closed off on each side by a pair of helices connected by a turn. The smaller hydrophobic core may have only a structural role and is formed by spatially close N-terminal and C-terminal segments. The two histidine residues provide the fifth and sixth heme ligands, and the propionate edge of the heme group lies at the opening of the heme crevice. Two isomers of cytochrome b5, referred to as the A (major) and B (minor) forms, differ by a 180° rotation of the heme about an axis defined by the α- and γ-meso carbons.

Cytochrome b5 in some biochemical reactions
 cytochrome-b5 reductase
 NADH + H+ + 2 ferricytochrome b5 → NAD+ + 2 ferrocytochrome b5
 L-ascorbate—cytochrome-b5 reductase
 L-ascorbate + ferricytochrome b5 → monodehydroascorbate + ferrocytochrome b5
 CMP-N-acetylneuraminate monooxygenase
 CMP-N-acetylneuraminate + 2 ferrocytochrome b5 + O2 + 2 H+ → CMP-N-glycoloylneuraminate + 2 ferricytochrome b5 + H2O
 stearoyl-CoA 9-desaturase
 stearoyl-CoA + 2 ferrocytochrome b5 + O2 + 2 H+ → oleoyl-CoA + 2 ferricytochrome b5 + H2O
 linoleoyl-CoA 9-desaturase
 linoleoyl-CoA + 2 ferrocytochrome b5 + O2 + 2 H+ → γ-linolenoyl-CoA + 2 ferricytochrome b5 + H2O

See also 
 Cytochrome b
 Cytochrome b5 deficiency
 P450-containing systems
 Cytochrome b5, type A

References

External links 
  – Solution structure of rat cytochrome b5 (form A)
  – Solution structure of rat cytochrome b5 (form B)
  – X-ray structure of cytochrome b558 from Ectothiorhodospira vacuolata
  – Methemoglobinemia due to deficiency of cytochrome b5

Cytochromes